Events from the year 1704 in Russia

Incumbents
 Monarch – Peter I

Events

 
 
  
 
 Treaty of Narva
 Admiralty Shipyard

Births

Deaths

References

 
Years of the 18th century in Russia